Robert Wayne Foster (April 27, 1942 – November 21, 2015) was an  American professional boxer who fought as a light heavyweight and heavyweight. Known as "The Deputy Sheriff", Foster was one of the greatest light heavyweight champions in boxing history. He won the world light heavyweight title from Dick Tiger in 1968 via fourth-round knockout, and went on to defend his crown fourteen times against thirteen different fighters in total from 1968 to 1974. Foster challenged Joe Frazier and Muhammad Ali during his career, but was knocked out by both (the fight with Ali was not for a world heavyweight title, but for the regional NABF version). He was named to Ring Magazine's list of 100 Greatest Punchers.  He was also named to Ring Magazine's list of the 80 Best Fighters of the Last 80 Years, ranking at #55. He was inducted into the International Boxing Hall of Fame in the inaugural class of 1990.

Early life
Foster was born at Borger, Texas on April 27, 1942. In his childhood years his family moved to Albuquerque in New Mexico, and he received his formal education at Albuquerque High School. On leaving school he enlisted with the United States Air Force, in which he served with the rank of Airman Second Class. He began boxing on the Golden Gloves amateur circuit, and also took part in competitive inter-service matches for the U.S. Air Force.

Boxing career
Foster started his professional career on the night of March 27, 1961, against Duke Williams, in Washington, D.C., winning by knockout in two rounds. The first 12 bouts of his career were spent campaigning in the United States' Eastern coast and in Canada. In his tenth bout, he made his first of multiple forays into the heavyweight division, and suffered his first loss, at the hands of  Doug Jones, by a knockout in the eighth round.

After two more wins, he went in 1963 to Peru, where he lost to South American champion Mauro Mina by a decision in ten rounds at Lima. This was his first major Light Heavyweight bout, but it wouldn't be his last.

Three more fights back in the States resulted in quick knockout wins for him, and then, in 1964, he made his second attempt at entering the heavyweight rankings, being knocked out in the seventh by future world Heavyweight champion Ernie Terrell. He finished the year by posting three more knockout wins at Light Heavyweight, two of them in the month of November. The night of November 11 was Foster's first win of note as a light-heavyweight. One month after knocking out Don Quinn  in the first round, he stepped up in the ring again and faced former world title challenger Henry Hank. He beat Hank by a knockout in the tenth.

In 1965, he had five fights, winning four and losing one. He beat Hank again, by decision in 12 rounds, and lost to Zora Folley, by a decision in ten rounds, in another attempt at joining the heavyweight top ten.

In 1966 he defeated Leroy Green in two rounds.

By 1967, Foster, although his attempts to become a top heavyweight were being frustrated, was a ranked light heavyweight. He decided to stick to the light-heavyweight division for the time being, and he won all seven of his fights, six by knockout. Among the fighters he beat were Eddie Cotton, Eddie Vick, and Sonny Moore. After defeating Moore, Foster was the world's number one ranked light heavyweight challenger.

World light-heavyweight champion
In 1968, Foster got his first shot at a world title. At Madison Square Garden in New York, on the night of March 24, Foster became world champion by knocking out Dick Tiger in four rounds. Tiger had been a two-time world middleweight champion and was defending his world light heavyweight crown that night. Foster then decided to box at heavyweight once again, and beat Charlie Polite by a knockout in three. He ended that year defeating Vick again, and his future world title challenger Roger Rouse, both by a knockout.

In 1969, he began by rising off the canvas to knock out Frank DePaula in the same first round and retain his belt. It is believed that was the first time ever a boxer won a world title fight in the first round after being floored in that same round. It is also believed that that fight is one of only three times that's happened... the second time being in 1984, when Juan Meza rose off a knockdown to dethrone world Jr. Featherweight champion Jaime Garza in the same first round too. It also happened in the 21st century, when Kendall Holt was dropped twice, only to knockout Ricardo Torres in round 1, for the WBO 140 lb title.

Foster's next fight in 1969 was against Andy Kendall, whom he beat in four rounds by knockout, to once again retain the crown. He closed the 1960s with two more knockout wins.

Frazier vs Foster
In 1970, Foster made two more trips to the heavyweights. In the first, he beat fringe contender Lee Wallace in six rounds by knockout. This was followed by a return to the light-heavyweight division to defend his title against Rouse. Infuriated by some comments that Rouse's manager had made before the bout concerning the fact that even though Foster knocked out Rouse in their first bout he was not able to drop him, Foster dropped Rouse five times en route to a fourth-round knockout victory. A knockout in 10 to retain the title against Mark Tessman followed, and then he was given the chance to challenge for the world heavyweight title. Facing world champion Joe Frazier on the night of November 18 in Detroit, he was knocked out in two rounds.

After defeating Hal Carroll by a knockout in four rounds to defend his crown, the WBA stripped him of the title, but he was still recognized by the WBC as a champion. Foster became enraged at the WBA, which proceeded to have Vicente Rondon of Venezuela and Jimmy Dupree fight for the world title. Rondon won, becoming the second Latin American world light-heavyweight champion (after José Torres), and Foster set his eyes on him. Foster went on defending his WBC title, and he defeated challengers Ray Anderson, Tommy Hicks, and Brian Kelly. Of those three, it was Anderson who was the only one to last the 15 round distance with Foster.

Ali vs Foster
Foster and Rondon met in Miami on April 7, 1972, in a unification bout. Foster became the undisputed world champion once again, by knocking Rondon out in the second round. In his next fight, he used what many critics have called one of the best punches in history to retain his title by a knockout in four against Mike Quarry. Foster then went up in weight and faced former and future world heavyweight champion Muhammad Ali, on November 21, 1972, in what was legendary referee Mills Lane's first bout of note as a referee. Foster lost to Ali by a knockout in the eighth, after being knocked down 7 times.

In 1973, Foster retained his title twice against Pierre Fourie, both by decision. Their second fight had a distinct social impact because it was fought in Apartheid-ruled South Africa, Foster being Black and Fourie being White. Foster became a hero to South African Blacks by beating Fourie the first time around, and in their rematch, the first boxing fight in South Africa during Apartheid featuring a White versus a Black, he cemented that position by defeating Fourie on points again.

Piet Koornhoff was the South African Minister of Sport at that time and he had to be persuaded to allow the fight. He had to amend the regulations relating to the prohibition of "mixed sport" in order to do so. Bob Foster was allowed into the country on condition that he refrain from making any political comments or speeches. In a post fight interview he diplomatically responded to a specific question that he liked the country and would be willing to come back again. This explains the sentiment of Mark Mathabane as noted in his autobiography Kaffir Boy, that South Africa's black population felt betrayed by Foster since he didn't address Apartheid during his time in South Africa.

His last defense as world light-heavyweight champion came in 1974, when he was dropped by Argentinian Jorge Ahumada, but managed to keep the title with a draw. After that, he announced his retirement, leaving the world's light-heavyweight championship vacant.

Foster returned to boxing in 1975, before retiring from the sport in 1978 at the age of 36.

Post-boxing life
In the mid-1970s Foster became a police officer with the Bernalillo County Sheriff's Department, later becoming a detective and a well known policeman in Albuquerque, New Mexico.

Personal life
He married Pearl with whom he had four children. He divorced then married Sue. He had a child named Nelson. Bobby married Patricia Saiz in 1982. Her death in 1984 was ruled a suicide. His fourth wife is Rosetta Benjamin.

Foster died at the age of 73 on November 21, 2015, in a hospital in Albuquerque, New Mexico. His body was buried at Fairview Memorial Park cemetery in Albuquerque.

Professional boxing record

See also

List of WBC world champions

References

External links
 
New Mexico Boxing, the Bob Foster story
http://www.bobfosterboxing.net
Bob Foster - CBZ Profile

|-

|-

|-

|-

|-

1938 births
2015 deaths
International Boxing Hall of Fame inductees
Light-heavyweight boxers
Boxers from Albuquerque, New Mexico
World Boxing Association champions
World Boxing Council champions
American male boxers
World light-heavyweight boxing champions
Boxers at the 1959 Pan American Games
Pan American Games silver medalists for the United States
Pan American Games medalists in boxing
Medalists at the 1959 Pan American Games